Clapton is a railway station on the Chingford branch of the Lea Valley lines, located in Upper Clapton in the London Borough of Hackney, east London. The station has been operated by London Overground since 2015.

The station is in Travelcard Zone 2 and Zone 3.

Services
The typical off-peak weekday service consists of:
4 trains per hour (tph) to London Liverpool Street;
4 tph to Chingford.
Before London Overground started operating the Chingford line, there was one train running between Liverpool Street and Hertford East that called here which provided the station with a link to Tottenham Hale and other stations such as Cheshunt, Broxbourne, and Ware.

Connections
London Buses routes 106, 253, 254 and 393 and night routes N253 serve the station.

References

External links

Railway stations in the London Borough of Hackney
Former Great Eastern Railway stations
Railway stations in Great Britain opened in 1872
Railway stations served by London Overground
Clapton, London